This is a list of Canadian television related events from 1996.

Events

Debuts

Ending this year

Television shows

1950s
Country Canada (1954–2007)
Hockey Night in Canada (1952–present)
The National (1954–present).

1960s
CTV National News (1961–present)
Land and Sea (1964–present)
Man Alive (1967–2000)
The Nature of Things (1960–present, scientific documentary series)
Question Period (1967–present, news program)
W-FIVE (1966–present, newsmagazine program)

1970s
Canada AM (1972–present, news program)
the fifth estate (1975–present, newsmagazine program)
Marketplace (1972–present, newsmagazine program)
100 Huntley Street (1977–present, religious program)

1980s
Adrienne Clarkson Presents (1988–1999)
CityLine (1987–present, news program)
Fashion File (1989–2009)
Fred Penner's Place (1985–1997)
Just For Laughs (1988–present)
Midday (1985–2000)
On the Road Again (1987–2007)
Venture (1985–2007)

1990s
 Comics! (1993–1999)
 Due South (1994–1999)
 Madison (1993–1997)
 North of 60 (1992–1997)
 The Passionate Eye (1993–present)
 Ready or Not (1993–1997)
 Royal Canadian Air Farce (1993–2008)
 The Red Green Show (1991–2006)
 This Hour Has 22 Minutes (1993–present)
 Witness (1992–2004)

TV movies

Television stations

Debuts

Births
July 6 - Robert Naylor, actor
August 23 - Cesar Flores, actor

Deaths
February 7 - Barbara Hamilton, actress, 69
May 22 – Robert Christie, actor and director, 82
June 7 - Marjorie Gross, writer and producer, 40 (ovarian cancer)
July 29 – Sean Roberge, actor, 24

References

See also
 1996 in Canada
 List of Canadian films of 1996